Varuzhan Sukiasyan (born 5 August 1956 in Yerevan), is an Armenian association football manager and former player. He is the brother of Yervand Sukiasyan.

Between 1978 and 1987, Sukiasyan played at FC Kotayk of Abovyan. He managed the Armenia national team in the 2000–2001 period. In 2015–2016, he worked as manager of the Armenia national team, his second spell.

Coaching career
In 1989, Sukiasyan began his coaching career in FC Lori from Vanadzor, then was the coach of Banants Kotayk between 1992 and 1994, including when they won the Armenian Cup in 1992. He also was the coach of Van Yerevan and Homenmen Beirut.

In 1998, Sukiasyan became the coach of Tsement Ararat with which he won the Armenian Premier League in 1998 and 2000 and Armenian Cup in 1998 and 1999. In the same time, he managed the Armenia U-21 team and Armenia national football team. In 2001, he also coached the newformed Spartak Yerevan.

He was again the coach of Homenmen Beirut between 2003 and 2005.

During at Ararat Yerevan, he was appointed in July 2006, replacing Abraham Khashmanyan, but was resigned in July 2007, left for Armenia U-21 team. In March 2008, Sukiasyan was again appointed as the coach of Ararat Yerevan, replacing his successor Dušan Mijić. He has been with the club when it won the Armenian Cup and reached the second place in Armenian Premier League, after a loss in the championship play-off match against Pyunik. He was again resigned in December 2008. In 2010, he was the coach of Impulse FC from Dilijan.

In April 2015, Sukiasyan was again take seat at Ararat Yerevan.

On 10 December 2015 he was appointed as head coach of the Armenia national football team.

Personal life
Between 2010 and 2015 Sukiasyan worked as the chief of the Yerevan Funeral Home, at the Yerevan Municipal, in Yerevan, Armenia.

Managerial statistics

References

External links 
 Varuzhan Sukiasyan at armfootball.tripod.com
 Varuzhan Sukiasyan at footballdatabase.eu

Living people
Soviet footballers
Armenian footballers
Soviet football managers
Armenian football managers
Armenia national football team managers
FC Ararat Yerevan managers
FC Spartak Yerevan managers
Footballers from Yerevan
1956 births
Association football forwards
Soviet Armenians